Scrooge: A Christmas Carol is a 2022 computer-animated musical fantasy comedy drama film directed by Stephen Donnelly from a screenplay by both Donnelly and the late Leslie Bricusse, adapted from the 1970 film Scrooge (for which Bricusse wrote the screenplay and composed the songs), in turn based on the novel A Christmas Carol by Charles Dickens. Produced by Timeless Films, the film features the voices of Luke Evans, Olivia Colman, Jessie Buckley, Jonathan Pryce, Johnny Flynn, James Cosmo and Trevor Dion Nicholas. It was released in select theaters on November 18, 2022, and made its streaming release in Netflix on December 2 of the same year. The film is dedicated to  Leslie Bricusse, who died a year before the film's release. The film received mixed reviews from critics.

Plot
On Christmas Eve in 1843, a jolly man named Harry Huffman sings about his love for the holiday ("I Love Christmas"). He encounters his elderly uncle Ebenezer Scrooge and his dog Prudence, but Scrooge manages to evade him long enough to decline giving any money to a charity and add in a debt owed to him by the local toy shop owner Tom Jenkins who can barely afford medical treatment for his frail mother. After returning to his counting house, he rudely declines an invitation to a Christmas dinner party from Harry and reluctantly lets his clerk, Bob Cratchit, take the day off for Christmas the next day. Bob is underpaid by Scrooge and lives in poverty with his wife Ethel and their many children, including Tiny Tim, who is seriously ill and cannot receive medical treatment due to being unable to afford it. Scrooge closes up for the night and he and Prudence go home as Scrooge sings about his exasperation with Christmas ("Tell Me").

Once he gets home, he is soon haunted by the spirit of his former business partner and friend, Jacob Marley, who is forced to pull long, heavy chains around his soul as a penalty for the bad actions he made in life. He warns Scrooge that he will suffer a similar fate when he dies, (except his chains will be even heavier and longer) unless he changes for the better and has arranged for three visitors to come by his house to teach him how to be a better man.
 
Once Scrooge is about to go to bed, he encounters the first visitor, a wax-like shape-shifting being called Past, who proceeds to take him through his life before present where he was forced to work in a factory on Christmas Day as a child due to his father being in a Debtors Prison and being visited by his younger sister Jen (who died in childbirth giving birth to Harry), when he was a young man and worked for a kind-hearted businessman named Mr. Fezziwig and was once engaged to his daughter Isabel ("Happiness") before Jacob Marley partnered with him for a more financially-increased job and Isabel left him when she witnesses Scrooge and Marley shut down a baker family's shop (the baker is revealed to be Bob Cratchit's father) and him focusing more on his business than her ("Later Never Comes"). Scrooge insists it was because both he and Isabel needed to be financially secure before they could be married, but clearly expresses regret for pushing her away. Before vanishing, Past tells Scrooge to remember his past and learn from it.

Scrooge then meets the next visitor, a joyful giant called Present, who wants to show Scrooge how to live life ("I Like Life"). He shows Scrooge how Harry will spend Christmas. Harry loves his uncle due to being told of the kindness of Scrooge's sister Jen, who died giving birth to him. He then is shown how the Cratchit family will spend Christmas in their small home and poor health, but go forth in life with happiness by being thankful for what they have, especially Cratchit's youngest son, the disabled Tiny Tim ("The Beautiful Day"). When Scrooge asks Present about Tim's fate, Present replies saying that he would have to ask the next visitor. 

Soon, Present’s body turns into Yet to Come’s, who shows Scrooge a future where Tom Jenkins leads a celebration of expressing gratitude to Scrooge ("Thank You Very Much"). At first, Scrooge thinks he's being praised, but Prudence soon finds out they are celebrating his death. Scrooge soon learns the truth himself after finding out that Tiny Tim has passed away and the Cratchit family are devastated. Upon seeing that only a few people have attended his funeral including an elderly Prudence (who proceeds to abandon Scrooge's grave to parts unknown) and a few men (including Tom who alongside another man who both came to mock Scrooge's death), Scrooge is also given an example of what Hell is like, and that is where he will go after death for eternity with heavy chains if he does not change his ways. Scrooge makes a vow that he will change for the better if it means that Tim will live on.

The next morning, Scrooge has fully repented his greedy ways and proceeds to spread joy to his associates like having the street urchins send out orders and invitations. With his place decorated for a Christmas party with everyone in attendance, he gives Harry a doll that Jen once made him, makes Cratchit his business partner, gives a donation to the charity workers, and erases Tom's debt. He also promises Tiny Tim that he will be able to seek medical help with his father’s pay rise. Scrooge then celebrates Christmas with his new assortment of companions. ("I'll Begin Again").

Voice cast 
 Luke Evans as Ebenezer Scrooge, a greedy moneylender who despises Christmas and the main protagonist.
 Olivia Colman as Past, an excitable shape-shifting being made of candle wax with a flame on top of her head. Her default form, whom Colman voices, is based on that of a singer Scrooge had seen on a poster.
 Jessie Buckley as Isabel Fezziwig, Scrooge's kind ex-fiancée and Mr. Fezziwig's daughter, now married to a new man.
 Jonathan Pryce as Jacob Marley, Scrooge's deceased business partner who is punished after death by dragging a large assortment of chains that represent his transgressions in life, and warns Scrooge to avoid him suffering the same fate but worse.
 Johnny Flynn as Bob Cratchit, Scrooge's long-suffering clerk who has many children.
 James Cosmo as Mr. Fezziwig, Scrooge's enthusiastic former employer and Isabel's father.
 Trevor Dion Nicholas as Present, a giant, fun-loving being wearing a giant green robe. His body later becomes the Yet to Come's.
 Fra Fee as Harry Huffman, Scrooge's fun-loving nephew who adores Christmas. He is based on Fred from the original story.
 Giles Terera as Tom Jenkins, the owner of the toy shop who is indebted to Scrooge.
 Homer Todiwala as Tamal
 Jemima Lucy Newman as Jen Scrooge, Scrooge's kind-hearted sister who died giving birth to Harry.
 Rebecca Gethings as Ethel Cratchit, Bob's wife who dislikes Scrooge.
 Rupert Turnbull as Tiny Tim, Bob and Ethel's sick son.
 Oliver Jenkins as Tiny Tim's singing voice.
 Devon Pomeroy as Kathy Cratchit, Bob and Ethel's daughter who likes to do Christmas caroling.
 Sheena Bhattessa as Hela Huffman, Harry's wife and Scrooge's niece-in-law.

Music

Release 
The film was released on Netflix on December 2, 2022, following a limited theatrical release in the United States on November 18, 2022.

Reception

See also
 List of Christmas films
 List of ghost films
 Adaptations of A Christmas Carol

References

External links 

2020s adventure films
2020s American animated films
2020s fantasy films
2020s children's animated films
2020s English-language films
2020s monster movies
2022 computer-animated films
Animated Christmas films
British adventure comedy films
British fantasy comedy films
British musical fantasy films
British children's animated films
British computer-animated films
British animated fantasy films
Animated films about magic
English-language Netflix original films
Film remakes
Films based on A Christmas Carol
American animated fantasy films
Compositions by Leslie Bricusse